John Cooke D.D. (1734–1823) was an English academic administrator at the University of Oxford.

Cooke was elected President (head) of Corpus Christi College, Oxford in 1783, a post he held until 1823.
While President at Corpus Christi College, Cooke was also Vice-Chancellor of Oxford University from 1788 until 1792.

References

1734 births
1823 deaths
Presidents of Corpus Christi College, Oxford
Vice-Chancellors of the University of Oxford